Mortazavi may refer to:
Bijan Mortazavi (b. 1957), Iranian musician
Saeed Mortazavi, Iranian judge and politician
Mortazavi, Iran, a village in Razavi Khorasan Province, Iran